White Mountain may refer to:

Mountains
 Akdağ, translating as white mountain; several different mountains in Turkey
 Bijela gora, a mountain in Montenegro
 Mont Blanc or Monte Bianco, the highest mountain in the Alps
Mauna Kea, tallest mountain in Hawai'i
 Paektu Mountain, a volcano on the border between North Korea and China
 Spīn Ghar, a mountain range in eastern Afghanistan
 Slieve Bawn, a 262 m hill in County Roscommon, in the Republic of Ireland, whose name means "white mountain"
 White Mountain (Sperrin Mountains), a 567 m peak in the Sperrin Mountains in Ulster, Northern Ireland
 White Mountain (Yosemite), a peak in Yosemite National Park, California, United States
 White Mountain Peak, a peak in California, United States
 White Mountain (Idaho), or White Mountain West; highest peak in the Salmon River Mountains
 White Mountain (Sevier County, Utah)
 White Mountain (Olympic Mountains), a summit in Olympic National Park, Washington state
 White Mountain (Washington), a summit in Glacier Peak Wilderness
 White Mountain (Wyoming), a long mountain in southwestern Wyoming, United States
 White Mountain in Mineral County, Montana

Other places
 White Mountain National Forest, a national forest in the US
 White Mountain, Alaska, a town in the United States
 White Mountain, County Antrim, a hill and townland in County Antrim, Northern Ireland

Other uses
 White Mountain Apache, a group of Western Apache Native Americans living in Arizona, United States
 The White Mountain School, a private boarding school in New Hampshire, United States
 White Mountain Group, a holding company for many insurance companies
 Battle of White Mountain, a battle in the Thirty Years' War
 White Mountain (song), a song by the rock group Genesis off their album Trespass
 ROKS Baekdusan, a warship name from Baekdusan whose name means "Mount Paektu"

See also
 False White Mountain, a peak in Yosemite National Park, California, United States
White Mountains (disambiguation)
 Biała Góra (disambiguation) (Polish for White Mountain), several places in Poland